Kiltane GAA (CLG Cill tSéadhna) is a Gaelic football club located in Bangor Erris, County Mayo. The club existed under the name St. Patrick's from 1962 until 1971.
Rory O'Donohoe winning championship side under 13 back in 1976/77

Honours
 All-Ireland Intermediate Club Football Championship: Runner-Up 2014
 Mayo Intermediate Football Championship 1973, 2013
 Connacht Intermediate Club Football Championship 2013
 Mayo Senior Football League Division 1 Championship 1992 
  Mayo Senior Global Windows League Championship 1992
 Mayo Junior Football Championship 1972

Notable players
 Tommy Conroy
 Johnny Carey

References

External links
Club Website

Gaelic football clubs in County Mayo
Gaelic games clubs in County Mayo